Shah Nawaz Khan (January 1914 – 9 December 1983) was an Indian politician who served as an officer in the Indian National Army (INA) during World War II. He was profoundly influenced by Subhas Chandra Bose's speeches asking POWs to join the Indian National Army and to fight for a free India, Khan led the army into North-Eastern India, seizing Kohima and Imphal which were held briefly by the INA under the authority of the Japanese. In December 1944, Shah Nawaz Khan was appointed Commander of the 1st Division at Mandalay. After the war, he was tried, convicted for treason, and sentenced to death in a public court-martial carried out by the British Indian Army. The sentence was commuted by the Commander-in-chief of the Indian Army following unrest and protests in India. After the trial, Khan declared that he would henceforth follow the path of non-violence espoused by Mahatama Gandhi and he joined the Congress party. Having successfully contested the first Lok Sabha in 1952 from Meerut, Khan had an illustrious parliamentary career. He was elected four times to the Lok Sabha from Meerut constituency in 1951, 1957, 1962 and 1971. He lost in the 1967 and 1977 Lok Sabha election from Meerut.

Early life
As he states in his autobiography, Khan was born into a Punjabi Janjua Rajput family on 24 January 1914 in Matore, a village now in the Rawalpindi District of Pakistan.

He was the cousin of Bollywood actor Shah Rukh Khan's father Mir Taj Mohammed Khan.

Other relatives served in the Pakistan Army, including his nephew Lieutenant-General (r) Zaheer-ul-Islam, who was the Director-General of the ISI between 2012 and 2014.

He got his military education at the Prince of Wales Royal Indian Military College. He was commissioned into the 14th Punjab Regiment.

The Second World War and the Indian National Army
Khan, who rose to the rank of captain in the Indian Army, was captured by the Japanese after the fall of Singapore in 1942. A prisoner of war in Singapore, he was profoundly influenced by Subhas Chandra Bose's speeches asking POWs to join the Indian National Army and to fight for a free India. He later stated: 
Impressed by Bose's patriotic speeches, Nawaz joined the INA in 1943. He was included in the Cabinet of the Provisional Government of Free India formed by Bose. Later, Bose decided to select a regiment consisting of the cream of the INA and send it to action to spearhead the advance into India. Khan led the army into North-Eastern India, seizing Kohima and Imphal which were held briefly by the INA under the authority of the Japanese. In December 1944, Shah Nawaz Khan was appointed Commander of the 1st Division at Mandalay.

Indian National Army trials

Khan was tried, along with General Prem Sahgal and Colonel Gurbaksh Singh Dhillon and Brigadier Habib ur Rehman of Panjeri (Bhimber) for "waging war against the King Emperor" in a public court martial at the Red Fort in Delhi. They were defended by Sir Tej Bahadur Sapru, Jawaharlal Nehru, Asaf Ali, Bhulabhai Desai, Kailash Nath Katju and others based on the defence that they should be treated as prisoners of war as they were not paid mercenaries but bona fide soldiers of a legal government, the Provisional Government of Free India, or the Azad Hind Government, "however misinformed or otherwise they had been in their notion of patriotic duty towards their country" and as such they recognized the free Indian state as their sovereign and not the British sovereign. During the trial, Khan cited the differential treatment meted out to Indian versus British soldiers in the Indian Army. In his testimony, Khan testified that no Indian officers were given the command of a division and only one was allowed to command a Brigade. Khan was given the death sentence by the court but that sentence was reduced to cashiering by the Commander-in-Chief of the Indian Army.

After the Indian National Army (INA) of Subhas Chandra Bose surrendered to British forces, officers and soldiers of the INA were arrested. Major General Shah Nawaz Khan, Col Prem Kumar, Brigadier Habib ur Rehman of Panjeri (Bhimber) and Col. Gurbaksh Singh Dhillon were tried in court. Upon the directive of Allama Mashriqi, the Khaksars made great efforts for their release and their efforts did not go in vain. During a visit to the Khaksar Tehrik headquarters, Major General Shah Nawaz thanked Allama Mashriqi for obtaining their release. The General also thanked the Khaksars and stated, "We are highly grateful to the Khaksar Tehrik for their efforts in obtaining our release". ("Al-Islah" dated 11 January 1946). On this occasion, Major General Shah Nawaz Khan and Col. Prem Kumar Sahgal were photographed with the founder of the Khaksar Tehrik (Khaksar Movement), the respected Allama Mashriqi.

Association with Mahatma Gandhi
In 1946, Major General Shah Nawaz Khan accompanied Mahatma Gandhi and Khan Abdul Ghaffar Khan to restore peace and provide succour to the Noakhali riot victims.

Political career
After the trial, Khan declared that he would henceforth follow the path of non-violence espoused by Gandhi and he joined the Congress party. Having successfully contested the first Lok Sabha in 1952 from Meerut, Khan had an illustrious parliamentary career becoming:

 The Parliamentary Secretary and Deputy Minister of Railway and Transport for 11 years (1952–1956) & (1957–1964 (second term))
 Minister of Food & Agriculture (1965)
 Minister of Labour, Employment & Rehabilitation (1966)
 Minister of Steel & Mines and Minister of Petroleum & Chemical Industries (1971–1973)
 Minister of Agriculture & Irrigation (1974–1975)
 Minister of Agriculture & Irrigation (1975–1977)
 Chairman of National Seeds Corporation Ltd.
 Chairman, Food Corporation of India.

He was elected four times to the Lok Sabha from Meerut constituency in 1951, 1957, 1962 and 1971. He lost in the 1967 and 1977 Lok Sabha election from Meerut. During the 1965 war, his son Mahmud was a Pakistan Army Officer and the opposition demanded he be removed from the government. But Lal Bahadur Shastri, as Prime Minister, refused to accede and reminded them of his selfless service to India as an Officer of the INA.

Khan's political views were leftist, supporting land reforms and public distribution. But his support for permanent separate personal laws for religious communities led to his defeat in the 1967 elections against Jan Sangh. In 1969, the Indian National Congress split, leading him to side with Indira Gandhi. The 1971 "Gareebi Hatao" campaign brought him again as MP from Meerut. In 1977, the Janata Party led to his defeat and ended his career in Parliament. He remained as head of Congress Sewa Dal until his death in 1983.

Shahnawaz Committee

In 1956, the government constituted a committee to look into the circumstances around Subhas Chandra Bose's death with Khan as the head. The committee included Bose's elder brother Suresh Chandra Bose.  The committee began its work in April 1956 and concluded four months later when two out of the three members (excluding Suresh Chandra Bose) concluded that Bose had died in the airplane crash at Taihoku (Japanese for Taipei) in Formosa (now Taiwan), on 18 August 1945. They stated that his ashes were kept in Japan's Renkoji Temple and should be reinstated to India.

In popular culture
Shah Nawaz Khan is a 1987 Indian short documentary film directed by J. S. Bandekar and produced by the Films Division of India. It covers his life and contributions to the Indian independence movement.

In the 2005 movie Netaji Subhas Chandra Bose: The Forgotten Hero, Khan was portrayed by actor Sonu Sood. In the 2017 film Raagdesh on the Red Fort Trials, he is portrayed by actor Kunal Kapoor.

He also contributed in the development of, Subhas Chandra, a 1966 Indian biographical drama film on the life of Subhas Chandra Bose.

Footnotes

References

External links 
 
 

1914 births
1983 deaths
20th-century Indian Muslims
Indian National Army personnel
Indian National Army personnel who were court-martialed
Indian revolutionaries
Rashtriya Indian Military College alumni
India MPs 1952–1957
India MPs 1957–1962
India MPs 1962–1967
India MPs 1971–1977
World War II prisoners of war held by Japan
Punjabi people
Indian Army personnel of World War II
Indian prisoners of war
British Indian Army officers
People from Rawalpindi District